HD 160342 is a star in the southern constellation of Ara. HD 160342 is its Henry Draper Catalogue designation.  It has an apparent visual magnitude of 6.35 and, based upon parallax measurements, is approximately  distant from Earth.

With a stellar classification of M3 III., this is an evolved red giant that is on the asymptotic giant branch.  It is a variable star that is classified as irregular, although changes in brightness of 0.1127 magnitudes at the rate of 0.37943 cycles per day (once every 2.6 days) have been detected in Hipparcos photometry.  It has been given the variable star designation V626 Arae (V626 Ara).

References

External links
 HR 6576
 Image HD 160342

Ara (constellation)
160342
086628
Arae, V626
6576
M-type giants
Slow irregular variables
Durchmusterung objects